The Euphrates barbel (Luciobarbus mystaceus) is a species of cyprinid fish found in the Tigris-Euphrates river system.

References 

Luciobarbus
Fish of Asia
Fish described in 1814